Oxyfluorfen is a chemical compound used as an herbicide. It is manufactured by Dow AgroSciences and Adama Agricultural Solutions under the trade names Goal and Galigan. Oxyfluorfen is used to control broadleaf and grassy weeds in a variety of nut, tree fruit, vine, and field crops, especially wine grapes and almonds. It is also used for residential weed control.

Toxicity
Oxyfluorfen has low acute oral, dermal, and inhalation toxicity in humans. The primary toxic effects are in the liver and alterations in blood parameters (anemia). It is classified as a possible human carcinogen.

Environmental impact
Oxyfluorfen is classified as an environmental hazard under the GHS due to being "very toxic to aquatic life with long lasting effects".

Oxyfluorfen is toxic to plants, invertebrates, and fish. Birds and mammals may also experience subchronic and chronic effects from oxyfluorfen. It is persistent in soil and has been shown to drift from application sites to
nearby areas. It can contaminate surface water through spray drift and runoff.

References

Herbicides